Jerzy Hordyński (born 18 October 1919 in Jarosław, died 14 June 1998 in Rome) was a Polish poet and writer. 

He studied law, Oriental studies and Polish philology at the Jan Kazimierz University in Lwow. He was one of the best-known poets from Lwów. After the city was occupied by the Soviets on 22 September 1939, he returned to his studies. During the German occupation (1941–1944) he published his poems in underground anthologies and illegal papers, and continued his studies at a secret university. He worked as a feeder of lice in Rudolf Weigl's Institute of Typhus Studies, like another famous Polish poet, Zbigniew Herbert.

After Lwów was reoccupied by the Soviets in July 1944 he was arrested and sentenced to the gulag for five years, to a camp in the Donbas. He was released after three years and moved to Kraków, where he finished his degree at the Jagiellonian University. In Kraków he wrote for the Tygodnik Powszechny. His first official volume of poetry, Return to the light was published in 1951. In 1956 he joined the editorial board of "Życie Literackie" where, together with Wisława Szymborska he ran a column entitled "literary mail". In 1961, due to health problems he moved to first Vienna and later Paris (where he studied at the Sorbonne), before finally settling in Rome in 1964. From there he sent in his writings to "Życie Literackie" and "Przekroj".

He was awarded many international awards, among others Gran Premio Italia. His works have been translated into many languages.

1919 births
University of Lviv alumni
Victims of post–World War II forced migrations
Jagiellonian University alumni
University of Paris alumni
Polish expatriates in Austria
Polish expatriates in France
Polish expatriates in Italy
1998 deaths